Gazmend is a given name. Notable people with the given name include:

Gazmend Çitaku (born 1970), Albanian Montenegrin photographer, publisher and librarian
Gazmend Demi, Albanian businessman
Gazmend Kapllani, Albanian-born writer and journalist
Gazmend Leka (born 1953, Albanian painter, artistic director and scholar
Gazmend Oketa (born 1968), Albanian politician
Gazmend Pula, Kosovar-Albanian intellectual, human rights campaigner, and diplomat
Gazmend Sinani (1991–2018), Kosovo Albanian basketball player 

Albanian masculine given names